The 1880–81 United States Senate elections were held on various dates in various states, coinciding with the presidential election of 1880. As these U.S. Senate elections were prior to the ratification of the Seventeenth Amendment in 1913, senators were chosen by state legislatures. Senators were elected over a wide range of time throughout 1880 and 1881, and a seat may have been filled months late or remained vacant due to legislative deadlock. In these elections, terms were up for the senators in Class 1.

The Democratic Party lost five seats. The newly elected Readjuster senator William Mahone caucused with the Republicans, and the Republican Vice President's tie-breaking vote gave the Republicans the slightest majority. This changed when Vice President Chester Arthur ascended to the Presidency on September 19, 1881: with the Vice Presidency vacant during the remainder of Arthur's term, the Senate became evenly divided for the first time in history.

Results summary 
Senate party division, 47th Congress (1881–1883)

 Majority party: Republican (37)
 Minority party: Democratic (37)
 Other parties: Independent (1); Readjuster (1)
 Total seats: 76

Change in Senate composition

Before the elections

After the elections

Race summaries

Elections during the 46th Congress 
In these elections, the winners were seated during 1880 or in 1881 before March 4; ordered by election date.

Races leading to the 47th Congress 
In these regular elections, the winners were elected for the term beginning March 4, 1881; ordered by state.

All of the elections involved the Class 1 seats.

Elections during the 47th Congress 
In these elections, the winners were elected in 1881 after March 4; ordered by date.

Maryland 

Arthur Pue Gorman won election William Pinkney Whyte for an unknown margin of votes for the Class 1 seat.

Nevada 

On January 12, 1881, James Graham Fair (Republican) was elected.

New York 

The New York election was held January 18, 1881, by the New York State Legislature.  Democrat Francis Kernan had been elected in January 1875 to this seat, and his term would expire on March 3, 1881.  At the State election in November 1879, 25 Republicans and 7 Democrats were elected for a two-year term (1880-1881) in the State Senate. At the State election in November 1880, 81 Republicans and 47 Democrats were elected for the session of 1881 to the Assembly. The 104th State Legislature met from January 4, 1881, on at Albany, New York.

The caucus of Republican State legislators met on January 13, State Senator Dennis McCarthy presided. All but one of the legislators were present, only State Senator Edward M. Madden (13th D.) was absent. The caucus nominated Ex-Congressman Thomas C. Platt for the U.S. Senate. Platt was a friend of the other U.S. Senator from New York, Roscoe Conkling, and belonged to the Stalwart faction. The opposing Half-Breeds (in the press sometimes referred to as the "anti-machine men") at first wanted to nominate Chauncey M. Depew, but he withdrew before balloting. The majority of the Half-Breeds, led by President pro tempore of the State Senate William H. Robertson, then supported Platt, a minority voted for Sherman S. Rogers, the defeated Republican candidate for Lieutenant Governor of New York in 1876. Congressman Richard Crowley was supported by a faction led by Speaker of the State Assembly George H. Sharpe, allied with Governor Alonzo B. Cornell. U.S. Vice President William A. Wheeler, and Congressmen Elbridge G. Lapham and Levi P. Morton also received votes.

The caucus of the Democratic State legislators met on January 17, State Senator Charles A. Fowler (14th D.) presided. They re-nominated the incumbent U.S. Senator Francis Kernan by acclamation.

Thomas C. Platt was the choice of both the State Senate and the Assembly, and was declared elected.

Notes: 
The votes were cast on January 18, but both Houses met in a joint session on January 19 to compare nominations, and declare the result.
State Senator Stevens (Dem., 22nd D.) was absent and did not vote.

Pennsylvania 

The Pennsylvania election was held on thirty separate dates from January to February 1881. On February 23, 1881, John I. Mitchell was elected by the Pennsylvania General Assembly. The Pennsylvania General Assembly, consisting of the House of Representatives and the Senate, convened on January 27, 1881, to elect a Senator to serve the term beginning on March 4, 1881. Thirty-five ballots were recorded on thirty separate dates spanning from January 27 to February 23, 1881. The results of the thirty-fifth and final ballot of both houses combined are as follows:

See also 
 1880 United States elections
 1880 United States presidential election
 1880 United States House of Representatives elections
 46th United States Congress
 47th United States Congress

Notes

References 

 Party Division in the Senate, 1789-Present, via Senate.gov
Members of the 47th United States Congress
SENATOR THOMAS C. PLATT; SELECTED BY THE CAUCUS UPON THE FIRST BALLOT in NYT on January 14, 1881
COMPLIMENTING MR. KERNAN.; THE DEMOCRATIC CAUCUS RENOMINATES HIM FOR UNITED STATES SENATOR in NYT on January 18, 1881
Election result: BUSY STATE LEGISLATORS in NYT on January 19, 1881
Pennsylvania Election Statistics: 1682-2006 from the Wilkes University Election Statistics Project